BFU may refer to:

 Free University of Brussels, Belgium
 German Federal Bureau of Aircraft Accident Investigation (Bundesstelle für Flugunfalluntersuchung)
 Aircraft Accident Investigation Bureau (Switzerland) (Büro für Flugunfalluntersuchungen)
 Beijing Forestry University
 Bulgarian Football Union
 Burgas Free University
 IATA code for Bengbu Airport, China
 Buzzfeed Unsolved, a documentary entertainment web series